R-SMADs are receptor-regulated SMADs.  SMADs are transcription factors that transduce extracellular TGF-β superfamily ligand signaling from cell membrane bound TGF-β receptors into the nucleus where they activate transcription TGF-β target genes. R-SMADS are directly phosphorylated on their c-terminus by type 1 TGF-β receptors through their intracellular kinase domain, leading to R-SMAD activation.

R-SMADS include SMAD2 and SMAD3 from the TGF-β/Activin/Nodal branch, and SMAD1, SMAD5 and SMAD8 from the BMP/GDP branch of TGF-β signaling.

In response to signals by the TGF-β superfamily of ligands these proteins associate with receptor kinases and are phosphorylated at an SSXS motif at their extreme C-terminus. These proteins then typically bind to the common mediator Smad or co-SMAD SMAD4.

Smad complexes then accumulate in the cell nucleus where they regulate transcription of specific target genes:
 SMAD2 and SMAD3 are activated in response to TGF-β/Activin or Nodal signals.
 SMAD1, SMAD5 and SMAD8 (also known as SMAD9) are activated in response to BMPs bone morphogenetic protein or GDP signals.

SMAD6 and SMAD7 may be referred to as I-SMADs (inhibitory SMADS), which form trimers with R-SMADS and block their ability to induce gene transcription by competing with R-SMADs for receptor binding and by marking TGF-β receptors for degradation.

See also
TGF beta signaling pathway

References

Further reading

External links
 

 
Developmental genes and proteins
SMAD (protein)